I. brasiliensis may refer to:
 Isistius brasiliensis, the cookiecutter shark, a small dogfish shark species found in warm oceanic waters worldwide
 Ilex brasiliensis, the Brazilian holly, a plant species native from Brazil

See also